The King's Name is a fantasy novel  by Welsh-Canadian writer Jo Walton, published by Tor Books in October 2001. It was Walton's second novel and a sequel to her first, The King's Peace.  A prequel, The Prize in the Game, was published in 2002.

Plot summary
Sulien ap Gwien, a woman warrior and the ruler of a small part of the island of Tir Tanagiri, finds herself unwillingly drawn into a civil war that pits brother against brother and sister against sister. After surviving an attempted poisoning, she discovers that the sorcerer Morthu, an old enemy, is stirring up discontent and rebellion against her friend the High King. Sulien must bring together an unlikely group of allies and do battle in both the physical and the spiritual world to defeat the sorcerer and restore the rule of law.

External links
The King's Peace Page Index Walton's site via the Wayback Machine

Reviews

2001 British novels
Welsh fantasy novels
Novels by Jo Walton
Modern Arthurian fiction
Tor Books books
2001 Canadian novels
Canadian fantasy novels